Rumors is the second major label extended play (EP) from American rapper Jake Miller. It was released on July 8, 2015. through Warner Bros. Records without prior announcement or promotion. The EP debuted and peaked at number 119 on the US Billboard 200, and sold 8,000 copies in its first week.

Critical reception
David Jeffires from AllMusic said "With material that's generally light and fluffy in the best sense of the words, rapper Jake Miller tends to shine on the short, EP format, dropping four to six of his infectious pop-rap tracks and then bowing out before he's anywhere near cloying." and went on to say that "[Rumors] is one of his best showcases."

Music videos
Miller released a music video for "Rumors", which was directed by Edgar Esteves, on July 8, 2015. On July 23, 2015, a music video for "Selfish Girls" was released, featuring cameos from Camila Cabello, Jasmine V, Meghan Trainor, and Nikki Flores. Miller released a music video for "Sunshine" on September 9, 2015, as a tribute to his close childhood friend, Dylan Andrew Schopp, who died by suicide on February 12, 2015. A music video for "Yellow Lights" premiered on October 6, 2015.

Track listing

Notes
 signifies a co-producer.

Charts

References

2015 EPs
Jake Miller (singer) albums
Warner Records EPs